OTW may refer to:

 "OTW" (DJ Luke Nasty song), 2016
 "OTW" (Khalid, Ty Dolla Sign and 6lack song), 2018
 Ones to Watch, an American music blog
 Organization for Transformative Works, a non-profit fan activist organization
 Ottawa language (ISO 639-3 language code)
 Meyers OTW, an American training biplane built by the Meyers Aircraft Company from 1936 to 1944
 Opérateur de transport de Wallonie (Transport Operator of Wallonia), a transport operator in Wallonia, Belgium.

See also
Off the Wall (disambiguation)